Apium annuum is one of the 20 species of the genus Apium of the family Apiaceae. It is an annual herb with a distribution in salt-marsh and saline habitats of Victoria, south and western Australia.

References

Further reading
 .

annuum
Plants described in 1979
Taxa named by Philip Sydney Short